Shane Warren Jones (born in Newmarket, Ontario) is a Canadian actor best known for his roles in the television series All My Children as Colton Johnson, His work on the final season of J. J. Abrams' Fringe, his work on G4's Attack of the Show! and has had uncredited roles in films such as Hitch, Ocean's Thirteen, and The Hammer. Jones has also performed in stunts in films as well in which he is also uncredited.

On February 10, 2011 he revealed in his Twitter he will portray the cybernetic ninja Cyrax in Mortal Kombat: Legacy.

Personal life 
Jones enjoys practicing martial arts and gymnastics, and currently resides in Los Angeles, California.

Filmography 
2004: Midnight Spike's House Brew (Bar patron, uncredited)
2005: Hitch (Dance floor wedding guest,uncredited)
2007: The Hammer (Nate)
2007: Ocean's Thirteen (Valet)
2008: Run! (Josiah Henry)
2009: The Unknown (The number 1)
2009: Attack of the Show! (Ninja)
2010: All My Children (Colton Johnson)
2011: Mortal Kombat: Legacy (Cyrax/Hydro)
2012: Fringe (Loyalist Guard)
2013: Screwed (Abdul)
2013: BK Comedy Series
2014: Fight to the finish

Stunts 
2009: Nip/Tuck - One episode
2010: Deadliest Warrior - One Episode
2011: Attack of the Show!- Two Episodes

As Producer 
2009: Attack of the Show! - One Episode

References

External links

Living people
Canadian male film actors
Canadian male television actors
People from Newmarket, Ontario
Canadian stunt performers
Black Canadian male actors
Male actors from Ontario
1972 births